"Sing, Little Birdie" is the  entrant song that took second place at the Eurovision Song Contest 1959. Performed by husband-and-wife duo Pearl Carr & Teddy Johnson, "Sing, Little Birdie" was the first UK Eurovision entrant to be recorded, reaching number 12 in the UK singles chart.

Pearl Carr & Teddy Johnson performed "Sing, Little Birdie" in the first semi-final of ESC/British Finals — the national preliminary round for the UK in Eurovision 1959 — on 2 March 1959. The duo also performed in the second semi-final of the British Finals on 5 March 1959 with the song "That's It, That's Love", making Pearl Carr & Teddy Johnson the only act to ever perform two songs in the same multi-artist formatted UK Eurovision pre-selection round; the duo also being double-entered in the national preliminary round for the UK in 1960. Polly Brown would perform two contending songs in the UK pre-selection round for Eurovision 1976 but as distinct acts: herself and as a member of Sweet Dreams.

"Sing, Little Birdie" was one of six songs to advance to the British Finals final held on 7 March 1959, at the close of which "Sing, Little Birdie" was announced as the UK entrant at Eurovision 1959; the semi-final and final results for the ESC/British Finals of 1959 were determined by seven regional panels each comprising fourteen members. At the finals for Eurovision 1959, held at Cannes on 11 March 1959, "Sing, Little Birdie" finished in second place, bettered by the ' entrant "Een beetje" by Teddy Scholten.

The song was mentioned in the Monty Python's Flying Circus sketch "World Forum/Communist Quiz" in 1970 as having won the 1959 contest as answered by Mao Zedong when it actually finished second.

References

Songs about birds
Columbia Graphophone Company singles
Eurovision songs of 1959
Eurovision songs of the United Kingdom
1959 songs